Einari is a Finnish and Estonian masculine given name, a cognate to the Scandinavian given name Einar.

People named Einari include:
Einari Aalto (1926–1985), Finnish swimmer
Einari Teräsvirta (1914–1995), Finnish gymnast and architect
Einari Vuorela (1889–1972), Finnish writer

References

Finnish masculine given names
Estonian masculine given names